Kentucky Route 864 (KY 864) is a  state highway located entirely in the Louisville metropolitan area of Jefferson County in north central Kentucky.

Route description 
KY 864 begins at a junction with KY 2053 in southern Jefferson County. The highway begins as an urban secondary route from there to the junction with Interstate 265 (I-265, Gene Snyder Freeway). It then intersects KY 1065 (Outer Loop), and then has a short concurrency with KY 1747 (Fern Valley Road). KY 864 is locally known as Poplar Level Road when it turns to the north and northwest to Watterson Park and Poplar Hills neighborhoods before crossing I-264 (Henry Watterson Expressway). KY 864 then continues northward into downtown Louisville, where it crosses Eastern Parkway, Broadway, and ends at the U.S. Route 31E (US 31E, Baxter Avenue) intersection with East Jefferson Street.

KY 864 in downtown is split into two one-way streets in downtown Louisville, the northbound lanes on Logan Street, while Shelby Street occupies the southbound lanes.

Major intersections

See also 

Roads in Louisville, Kentucky

References

0864
0864